Adil Boulbina (born May 2, 2003, in El Milia) is an Algerian professional footballer who plays for Paradou AC and the Algeria national under-23 football team.

Club career 
Boulbina made his professional debut for Paradou AC on the August 16, 2021, coming on as a second half substitute for Hicham Messiad in a 2–3 Ligue Professionnelle 1 away loss against NA Hussein Dey.

References

External links

2003 births
Living people
Algerian footballers
Algeria youth international footballers
Algeria international footballers
Association football midfielders
Paradou AC players
Algerian Ligue Professionnelle 1 players
People from Jijel Province